Mehr Eliezer (born 16 January 1997) is a Panamanian model, actress and beauty pageant titleholder who was crowned Señorita Panamá 2019. She represented Panama at Miss Universe 2019. Born in New Delhi, she was raised in Panama and the Philippines.

Personal life 
Mehr Eliezer was born in New Delhi, India and raised in Ciudad de Panamá. She lived in Davao in the Philippines for two years where she attended the Ateneo de Davao. She graduated from Balboa Academy in 2015 and earned two Bachelor’s degrees in International Relations and Economics from Florida State University in 2019. She is fluent in English and Spanish; she also speaks Hindi, Tagalog and Portuguese.

As a young girl she swam for one of the Panama swim clubs and her school swim team. She also did theater from a very young age and starred in “Saturday Night Fever” and “High School Musical” when she was in college. Mehr started boxing when she was 19. 

She started her singing career by launching her first single titled "Pecado" in 2020. "Pecado" was a huge success in Central America charting on Latin America's top 50 for 6 consecutive weeks. She then released "Chocolate" and "Lunatica" in 2021.

Pageantry 
On January 16, 2019, Mehr attended the casting for the Señorita Panamá competition. On June 20, 2019, Eliezer began her pageantry career representing Isla Flamenco in the Señorita Panamá 2019 competition at the Roberto Durán Arena in Panama City, where she was crowned as Miss Universe Panama 2019. Also, she won a special award of Miss Pandora. She succeeded outgoing by Señorita Panamá 2018 Rosa Montezuma. As Señorita Panamá, Eliezer represented her country at Miss Universe 2019 but unplaced.

See also 
Señorita Panamá 2019

References

External links 
Señorita Panamá Official Website

1997 births
Living people
Miss Universe 2019 contestants
Panamanian beauty pageant winners
Panamanian female models
People from Panama City
Panamanian people of Indian descent
Indian emigrants to Panama